Patrik Holomek (born 6 September 1974) is a Czech former football player. He was twice top goal scorer in the Czech 2. Liga, firstly for Poštorná and later for Staré Město. He scored over 50 goals in the Czech 2. Liga over his career.

Honours

Individual 
 Czech 2. Liga top goalscorer: 1995–96, 1998–99

Personal life
Patrik Holomek's older brother, Pavel, also played professional football.

References

External links
 Profile at iDNES.cz

Czech footballers
Czech First League players
1974 births
Living people
FC Zbrojovka Brno players
Association football forwards
Footballers from Brno
SK Dynamo České Budějovice players
FC Fastav Zlín players
1. FC Slovácko players
FC Hradec Králové players